These are the official results of the Women's Pentathlon competition at the 1980 Summer Olympics in Moscow, USSR. There were a total number of 19 participating athletes, with the competition held on 24 July 1980.  This was to be the last Pentathlon competition at this level as the Heptathlon subsequently replaced it in 1984 and became the multi-event competition for women.

Results

See also
 1976 Women's Olympic Games Pentathlon (Montreal)
 1978 Women's European Championships Pentathlon (Prague)
 1982 Women's European Championships Heptathlon (Athens)
 1983 Women's World Championship Heptathlon (Helsinki)
 1984 Women's Olympic Games Heptathlon (Los Angeles)
 1984 Women's Friendship Games Heptathlon (Prague)

References

External links
 Results

P
1980
1980 in women's athletics
Women's events at the 1980 Summer Olympics